Integrin alpha-8 is a protein that in humans is encoded by the ITGA8 gene.

References

Further reading

External links
ITGA8 Info with links in the Cell Migration Gateway 

Integrins